Dusinberre is a surname. Notable people with the surname include:

Edward Dusinberre (born 1968), British classical violinist
Elspeth R. M. Dusinberre (born 1968), American professor of classics
Martin Dusinberre (born 1976), British historian